Light: Science & Applications is a peer-reviewed open-access scientific journal published by Nature Portfolio on behalf of the Changchun Institute of Optics, Fine Mechanics and Physics, Chinese Academy of Sciences and the Chinese Optical Society. It covers research on all aspects of optics. The journal was established in March 2012 and the editors-in-chief are Jianlin Cao and Xi-Cheng Zhang.

Abstracting and indexing
The journal is abstracted and indexed in the following databases:

According to the Journal Citation Reports, the journal has a 2021 impact factor of 20.257, ranking it 3rd out of 101 journals in the category "Optics".

References

External links

Nature Research academic journals
English-language journals
Optics journals
Photonics
Publications established in 2012
Creative Commons Attribution-licensed journals